Ghost Train, previously Derren Brown's Ghost Train, is a dark ride at Thorpe Park in Surrey, England. The attraction incorporates motion simulation and illusion. It is set in a themed derelict Victorian railway depot. It first opened in July 2016, then reopened as Derren Brown's Ghost Train: Rise Of The Demon in March 2017. In 2023 it will reopen as Ghost Train.

History
Derren Brown's Ghost Train was first teased on 8 July 2015 after reportedly three years in planning. The project name was referred to as 'WC16'.

Merlin Magic Making, the development division of Merlin Entertainments, designed the attraction in collaboration with British mentalist Derren Brown and his team. The main experience is a simulator dark ride built by Simworx, originally with on-board virtual reality (produced by Figment Productions). Severn Lamb and Intamin engineered the complex transit system.

The project altogether was reported in the Financial Times as having a cost of £13 million.

After the 2022 season, the virtual reality and association with Derren Brown was removed.

Opening 
In anticipation of the new attraction, Thorpe Park began a "Get in for a Bob" promotion, where 1871 people would be able to purchase a ticket into the resort for the modern-day equivalent of a shilling in Victorian times, which equals 5 pence.  The website was published earlier than the scheduled time which resulted in many being unable to get tickets. The resort offered that those who registered their name before the website closed would be entered into a raffle, where a further 4,000 12 pence tickets would be allocated at random.

The attraction was originally set to open on 6 May 2016, as announced on their social networks. However one week before the attraction was set to open, the resort announced the attraction would not be ready due to "some illusions not working as anticipated".

See also
 HTC Vive, the VR headsets the ride formerly used.

References

Dark rides
Amusement rides manufactured by Intamin
Amusement rides introduced in 2016